Whitmore High School is a state secondary school in the London Borough of Harrow. The school's students are mostly drawn from the wider Harrow area. In March 2015, the school was judged "Outstanding" by Ofsted for the second time.

History
Whitmore High School was created in September 1974 when the London Borough of Harrow adopted a comprehensive system of education. It was formerly two schools on one site, Lascelles Boys' Secondary School and Lascelles Girls' Secondary School.

Whitmore is now an established community comprehensive school with a sixth form and is a specialist Science College. In September 2010 the school moved to a new building.

Whitmore High School's last two Ofsted inspections, one in 2007 and the latest in 2015, have both judged the school as "Outstanding".

Sixth Form
Whitmore opened its sixth form in 2005 as part of the borough's "collegiate" post-16 offer. Along with the rest of the school, Whitmore's sixth form was judged as "Outstanding" by Ofsted in 2015.

The construction of a new sixth form block began in late 2013, and the finished building opened in 2015, consisting of six classrooms and a new sixth form common room and study area.

Former pupils

 Dev Patel, actor
 Owen Hurcum, former mayor of Bangor, Gwynedd

References

External links
 Whitmore High School
 Harrow Council Homepage

Secondary schools in the London Borough of Harrow
Community schools in the London Borough of Harrow